Furious 7: Original Motion Picture Soundtrack is the soundtrack to Furious 7. It was released on March 17, 2015, by Atlantic Records. The film had three initial promotional singles released from the soundtrack. The first was "Ride Out", performed by Kid Ink, Tyga, Wale, YG and Rich Homie Quan. "Ride Out" also had a music video alongside its release, and the second single was "Go Hard or Go Home", performed by Wiz Khalifa and Iggy Azalea. Both singles were released on February 17, 2015. "Off-Set", performed by T.I. and Young Thug was the final promotional single for the film, and had a music video accompanied its release.

Wiz Khalifa released a music video for "See You Again" as the final tribute to late Paul Walker as Brian O'Conner in the film series. It features pop singer Charlie Puth, who wrote the song alongside Khalifa. The music video consisted of compiled archive footage from the duration of the film series in special memory of Walker. "See You Again" was a huge international success, reaching number one in fourteen countries, including the US, ending Mark Ronson's "Uptown Funk" fourteen-week reign at the top of the chart. The song received a nomination for Best Original Song at the 73rd Golden Globe Awards.

Commercial performance
In the United States, the album debuted at number 12 on the chart, dipped 5 spots to 17, before gaining traction and moving up 15 positions marks the largest jump into the top 2 of the chart, since Les Misérables, which moved 31 positions (33–2) in the week ending January 22, 2013. The album peaked at number one on the US Billboard 200 albums chart for one week in its fourth week, in the week ending April 12, 2015, earning 111,000 album-equivalent units (58,000 copies of traditional album sales). It was buoyed by the popularity and increase in sales of its single, "See You Again" (which also went number one on the US Billboard Hot 100, with 464,000 sales the same week), which allowed the album to edge over Future Hearts by All Time Low's 75,000 traditional album sales.

As of May 2015, the album has sold 145,000 copies, making it the second best-selling The Fast and Furious soundtrack, behind The Fast and the Furious: Tokyo Drift (235,000 copies) and ahead of Fast Five (94,000 copies), Fast & Furious 6 (80,000 copies) and Fast & Furious (69,000 copies). The album also reached number 2 on the UK Compilation Chart (held off by Now 90).

Critical reception
Writing for Rolling Stone, and rating the album three and a half-out-of-five stars, Nick Murray states: "Pop music and cars have a long history, but the Furious 7 soundtrack goes one step further, seeking out 16 tracks thrilling enough for the biggest chase movie of the decade. The resulting LP doesn't just move between hip-hop, EDM and Latin pop—it shows all three genres trading ideas. Environmentalists, rejoice: This one is plenty of fun even if no one's burning gas."

Track listing 

Notes
 signifies a vocal producer
 signifies an additional producer
 signifies a co-producer

Sample credits
"How Bad Do You Want It (Oh Yeah)" contains a sample of "Utopia", performed by Bang La Decks, written by Klejdi Llupa and Theodore Economou.
"Blast Off" contains a sample of "Ain't Talkin' 'bout Love", performed and written by Van Halen.
"Six Days (Remix)" contains a sample of "Six Day War", performed by Colonel Bagshot and written by Brian Farrell.
"GDFR (Noodles Remix)" contains a sample of "Low Rider", performed and written by War.

Charts

Weekly charts

Year-end charts

Decade-end charts

Certifications

References

Fast & Furious albums
2015 soundtrack albums
Atlantic Records soundtracks
Albums produced by Lil' C (record producer)
Albums produced by DJ Frank E
Albums produced by J. R. Rotem
Action film soundtracks
Thriller film soundtracks